Shivaji VI(April 05, 1863 – December 25, 1883) of the Bhonsle dynasty, was Raja of Kolhapur from 1871 to 1883. A distant relation of the main family line, he was born as Shrimant Narayanrao Dinkarrao Bhonsle and was adopted at the age of eight by the widow of Rajaram II. Owing to his youth, he reigned under a regency until he had attained his majority. In 1875, he was presented with a sword of honour by the future Edward VII and on New Year's Day, 1877, was knighted with the title of Knight Commander of the Order of the Star of India(KCSI), at the age of 13, the youngest knight ever of that honour. Later that same year, he also became the youngest recipient of the Empress of India Medal.

Alleged madness and the Kolhapur affair

By 1882, Sir Shivaji (according to the British colonial authorities) had become insane, and was placed under the protection of the British Government, with a regent appointed for the state, Karbhari Mahadeo Barve.

This aroused a considerable controversy. British officials and doctors reiterated that Shivaji VI was suffering from an incurable madness. This official version received support from English newspapers such as the Times of India and the Bombay Gazette.

However, this was strongly disputed by some Indian-owned newspapers such as Induprakash, Mahratta, and Kesari. The latter two were published in English and Marathi respectively, and had been founded shortly before by Lokmanya Bal Gangadhar Tilak, a prominent leader of the Indian Independence movement.

In Kesari, there was a public questioning of the diagnosis, treatment, and mental state of Chhatrapati. Kesari, then under the editorship of Agarkar, and Mahratta under Tilak, argued that Shivaji VI was not mad and the little instability in his mental state was caused by the maltreatment given to him by the servants and officials appointed to take care of him.

They especially accused Mahadeo Barve, the British-appointed Regent of Kolhapur, of complicity in a conspiracy to make Shivaji VI mad. Letters published in Kesari and Mahratta, allegedly written by Mahadeo Barve to his subordinate officials, indicated his involvement along with some British officials and native servants in a plot to poison Shivaji VI.

To clear himself of the charges, Mahadeo Barve filed a defamation case against Tilak and Agarkar. The trial which followed brought into the public sphere the private life of Shivaji VI and the ill treatment meted out to him by British officials.

Kesari published the verbatim account of the High Court trial drama, which in its editors' opinion exposed to public scrutiny the barbarous attitude of the British officers towards Shivaji VI. On July 16, 1882 the jury found Tilak and Agarkar guilty on the charge of slander against Mahadeo Barve and sentenced them to four months imprisonment at Dongri jail in Bombay.

Even during the trial, Kesari published articles which questioned the physical control of British officers over the body of Shivaji VI and expressed fears regarding danger to Shivaji VI's life from officers appointed to protect him. In spite of such accusations, the British government did not remove Shivaji VI from the custody of these officers.

Death & aftermath

Eventually, Shivaji VI died as a youngster in 1883. The whole episode became famous as the Kolhapur Prakaran(affair). 

Removed to Ahmednagar, Sir Shivaji VI died a year later on December 25, 1883 at the age of 20, in a scuffle with, or due to beating received from a British soldier appointed to take care of him – Private Lloyd Passingham. He was succeeded by Shahu as he had left no heir.

The manner of his death was widely regarded as a vindication of the accusations made by the Indian nationalists, in spite of the court ruling against them, the whole issue being a landmark in the development of the Indian Independence Movement.

Titles

 1863–1871: Shrimant Narayanrao Dinkarrao Bhonsle

 1871–1877: His Highness Shrimant Rajashri Shivaji VI Chhatrapati Maharaj Sahib Rao Bahadur, Raja of Kolhapur

 1877–1883: His Highness Shrimant Rajashri Sir Shivaji VI Chhatrapati Maharaj Sahib Bahadur, Raja of Kolhapur, KCSI

References

Sources
The London Gazette, 1 January 1877

Murdered Indian royalty
1863 births
1883 deaths
Knights Commander of the Order of the Star of India
Maharajas of Kolhapur
Indian knights